Club Baloncesto Axarquía, more known by its sponsorship name of Clinicas Rincón Axarquía, was a basketball team based in Málaga, Andalusia.

History
Until the 2000s, Axarquía played in Regional leagues and in Liga EBA. In 2005 the team achieved a vacant berth in LEB 2 and started its collaboration as the farm team of Unicaja. Since 2011, the club started playing its games out of the comarca of Axarquía.

In July 2013, when Unicaja was going to resign to continue with its reserve team in LEB Plata, a local entrepreneur rescued CB Axarquía and achieved a vacant berth in LEB Oro. Axarquía agreed also new collaboration terms with Unicaja and now is playing again as farm team.

In March 2015 it was announced CB Axarquía would leave the professional leagues at the end of the season and would restart its project at Liga EBA, but finally the club accepted to play in LEB Plata.

One year later, CB Axarquía would be dissolved due to the lack of support. Manolo Rincón, president and sponsor of the club, accepted the proposal of Unicaja Málaga to sponsor all the youth teams of the club.

Season by season

Notable players
 Álex Abrines
 Ricardo Guillén
 Nedžad Sinanović
 Vítor Faverani
 Augusto Lima
 Paulão Prestes
 Rafa Luz
 Domantas Sabonis
 Tautvydas Sabonis
 Vilmantas Dilys
 Andrej Magdevski
 Ognjen Kuzmić

References

External links
Official website

Defunct basketball teams in Spain
Basketball teams in Andalusia
Former LEB Oro teams
Former LEB Plata teams
Former Liga EBA teams
Basketball teams disestablished in 2016
Basketball teams established in 1988
Sport in Málaga